Following is an incomplete list of past and present Members of Parliament (MPs) of the United Kingdom whose surnames begin with K.  The dates in parentheses are the periods for which they were MPs. 

KA
 Mike Kane (2014–present)
 Gerald Kaufman (1970–2017)
Arthur MacMurrough Kavanagh
Thomas Kavanagh
Walter MacMurrough Kavanagh
Daniel Kawczynski (2005–present) KE
 Sir John Keane, 1st Baronet
Maurice Keatinge
John Hodson Kearsley
Sally Keeble (1997–2010)
 Barbara Keeley (2005–present)
 Alan Keen (1992–2011)
 Ann Keen (1997–2010)
Whitshed Keene
 Paul Keetch (1997–2010)
Sir George Kekewich
Samuel Trehawke Kekewich
 Elaine Kellett-Bowman 
 Frederic Arthur Kelley (1918–1923)
 Chris Kelly (2010–2015)
 Ruth Kelly (1997–2010)
Charles Kemeys-Tynt (1820-1837)
Charles Kemeys-Tynt (1832–1837);(1847–1865)
Thomas Arthur Kemmis
 Fraser Kemp (1997–2010)
Thomas Kemp
Thomas Read Kemp
 Liz Kendall (2010–present)

Edmund Hegan Kennard
Robert Kennard
Archibald Kennedy, Earl of Cassilis
 Charles Kennedy (1983–2015)
 Jane Kennedy (1992–2010)
 Seema Kennedy (2015–present)
Thomas Francis Kennedy
 Matthew Joseph Kenny (1882–1895)
 William Kenny (1892–1897)
Lloyd Kenyon (1830–1832)
William Keogh
Augustus Keppel, 5th Earl of Albemarle
George Keppel
William Kenrick
David Ker
Richard Gervas Ker
 George Kerevan (2015–present)
 Calum Kerr (2015–present)
Edward Kerrison
 Robert Key (1983–2010)
KH
 Piara Khabra (1992–2007)
 Sadiq Khan (2005–present)
KI
 James Kibblewhite
David Kidney (1997–2010)
John Kiely
 James Kilfedder
 Peter Kilfoyle (1991–2010)
Ged Killen
 Danny Kinahan (2015–present)
 Andy King (1997–2005)
Edward King, Viscount Kingsbrough 
 Horace King (1950–1970)
John King
 Oona King (1997–2005)
Admiral Sir Richard King
Robert King, 4th Earl of Kingston
 Tom King (1970–2001)
 Tess Kingham (1997–2001)
John Alexander Kinglake
John Kingston
Charles Kinnaird
Douglas Kinnaird
William Shepherd Kinnersley
 Neil Kinnock (1970–1995)
 Stephen Kinnock (2015–present)
 Julie Kirkbride (1997–2010)
 Timothy Kirkhope (1987–1997)
 Archy Kirkwood, Baron Kirkwood of Kirkhope (1983–2005)
KN
Roger Knapman 
George Knapp 
Edward Knatchbull-Hugessen 
Sir Edward Knatchbull, 8th Baronet 
Sir Edward Knatchbull, 9th Baronet 
 Angela Knight 
 Greg Knight 
Sir James Knight 
 Jim Knight (2001–2010)
 Jill Knight 
 Julian Knight (2015–present)
Richard Payne Knight 
Robert Knight 
Thomas Knowles 
 Sir David Knox 
George Knox 
Thomas Knox, 1st Earl of Ranfurly 
Thomas Knox, 2nd Earl of Ranfurly 
KU
 Ashok Kumar (1991–1992, 1997–2010)
KW
 Kwasi Kwarteng (2010–present)
KY
 Peter Kyle (2015–present)
Sir John Kynaston, 1st Baronet
 George Kynoch

 K